The , formally known as JRI Solutions, Limited, is a subsidiary of NTT Data and an equity method affiliate of the Sumitomo Mitsui Financial Group that acts as an IT consulting services corporation for general industries and public corporations.

History 
The Japan Research Institute, Limited under the Sumitomo Mitsui Financial Group originally established the JSOL Corporation as a wholly owned subsidiary called JRI-Solutions, Limited in July 2006.

On September 29, 2008, NTT Data, the Sumitomo Mitsui Financial Group, The Japan Research Institute, Limited, and JRI-Solutions, Limited established a broad-range capital and business alliance.

On January 1, 2009, JRI-Solutions, Limited became the subsidiary of NTT Data and the corporate name changed from JRI-Solutions to the JSOL Corporation.

Services and products 
The JSOL Corporation provides IT consulting, systems implementation, outsourcing, and develops and distributes various computer-aided engineering (CAE) software such as JMAG and LS-DYNA.

Company locations 
 Tokyo Head Office: Harumi Center Bldg. 2-5-24 Harumi, Chuo-ku, Tokyo 104-0053
 Sangen-jaya Office
 Osaka Head Office：Tosabori Daibiru Bldg. 2-2-4 Tosabori, Nishi-ku, Osaka 550-0001 
 Nagoya Regional Office

See also 
 NTT Data
 Sumitomo Mitsui Financial Group

References 

 NTT Data, Capital and Business Alliance Makes New Start as JSOL Corporation, January 5, 2009
 NTT Data, Capital and Business Alliance of JRI Solutions, September 29, 2008
 JSOL Corporate Profile

External links 
 

Nippon Telegraph and Telephone
Information technology consulting firms of Japan
Sumitomo Mitsui Financial Group